Christopher Rithe (1531–1606) was MP for Petersfield from October 1555 to 1559.

A lawyer, he was from Northington.

References

1531 births
1606 deaths
People from Petersfield
16th-century English people
17th-century English people
English MPs 1555
People from the City of Winchester